"I Like Chopin" is a song by Italian singer-songwriter Gazebo from his debut studio album, Gazebo (1983). It is generally regarded as one of the most significant Italo disco tracks of the mid-1980s. It peaked at number one in several European national charts. The music was composed by Giombini (contrary to popular belief without themes from Chopin). The lyrics were written by Gazebo.

Track listing and formats 

 Italian 7-inch single

A. "I Like Chopin" – 4:09
B. "I Like Chopin" (Instrumental) – 4:20

 German 12-inch maxi-single

A. "I Like Chopin" – 7:40
B. "I Like Chopin" (Instrumental) – 7:55

Credits and personnel 

 Gazebo – songwriter, vocals
 Pierluigi Giombini – songwriter, producer, arranger, programming
 Gianpaolo Bresciani – mixing

Credits and personnel adopted from the Gazebo album and 7-inch single liner notes.

Charts

Weekly charts

Year-end charts

Certifications and sales

Asami Kobayashi version 
In 1984, Japanese singer and actress Asami Kobayashi recorded a Japanese-language cover of the song titled "Amaoto wa Chopin no Shirabe" ("The Sound of Rain is Chopin's Music"), with lyrics by Yumi Matsutoya. The song peaked at the top of the Oricon Singles Chart for three weeks.

See also 

 Lists of number-one singles (Austria)
 List of number-one hits of 1983 (Germany)
 List of number-one singles of 1983 (Spain)
 List of number-one singles of the 1980s (Switzerland)

References 

1983 songs
1983 singles
Cultural depictions of Frédéric Chopin
English-language Italian songs
Gazebo (musician) songs
Number-one singles in Austria
Number-one singles in Germany
Number-one singles in Italy
Number-one singles in Spain
Number-one singles in Switzerland
Song recordings produced by Pierluigi Giombini
Songs about classical music
Songs about musicians
Songs written by Gazebo (musician)
Songs written by Pierluigi Giombini